Euan Hillhouse Methven Cox (1893–1977) was a Scottish plant collector, botanist, and horticulturist, who accompanied Reginald Farrer on his last botanical expedition to Burma and its border with China, from 1919 to 1920. He was a very successful propagator of rhododendrons and had an extensive collection in his garden at Glendoick, Perthshire, Scotland, which formed the basis of his commercial nursery, later run by his son, Peter A Cox, and grandson, Kenneth N.E. Cox.

Selected publications
 
 1944. The Honourable East India Company and China. Proceedings of the Linnean Soc. 156: 5-8
 Euan Hillhouse Methven Cox, Peter Alfred Cox. 1958. Modern shrubs. Ed. Nelson. 215 pp.
 ------------, ------------. 1956. Modern rhododendrons. Ed. Thomas Nelson & Sons. 193 pp.
 1947. Primulas for garden and greenhouse. Ed. Dulau; B.H. Blackwell. 86 pp.
 1945. Plant Hunting in China: A History of Botanical Exploration in China and the Tibetan Marches. Ed. Collins. 228 pp.
 1935. A history of gardening in Scotland. Ed. Chatto & Windus for New flora & Silva Ltd. 228 pp.
 1927. The modern English garden. Ed. Country life Ltd. 192 pp.
 1927. The evolution of a garden. Volume 132 Home university library of modern knowledge. Ed. Williams & Norgate. 256 pp.
 1924. Rhododendrons for amateurs. Ed. Country life Ltd. 111 pp.

Species named after him 
(Berberidaceae) Berberis coxii C.K.Schneid.
(Cupressaceae) Juniperus coxii A.B.Jacks.

Bibliography
 2008. Suki Urquhart. ‘Cox, Euan Hillhouse Methven (1893–1977)’

References

1893 births
1977 deaths
People educated at Cargilfield School
People educated at Rugby School
Alumni of Trinity Hall, Cambridge
Botanists with author abbreviations
Scottish botanists
Asian expeditions